Saša Petrović (born 31 December 1966) is a Montenegrin football manager and former goalkeeper.

Playing career

Club
After playing for OFK Titograd, he moved to FK Budućnost Podgorica where he would spend almost a decade, being the only exception a loan season at FK Sutjeska Nikšić. Next he played two seasons with OFK Beograd. In 1996, he would sign with another South Korean club, Jeonnam Dragons of K League. In 1997, he will play one season in Spanish Second League club Elche CF before returning to OFK in 1998–99. He finished his career playing again with Shandong until 2000, coached by Serbian manager Slobodan Santrač.

International
He played one match for the FR Yugoslavia national team on 28 January 1998, in a friendly match against Tunisia, a 3–0 win. He came on as a late substitute for Dragoje Leković.

Managerial career
In August 2015, he became the assistant manager of Miodrag Božović at Serbian SuperLiga side Red Star Belgrade.

Honours

Club
Shandong Jinan Taishan/Shandong Luneng
Chinese Jia-A League: 1999
Chinese FA Cup: 1995, 1999
Chunnam Dragons
Korean FA Cup: 1997

References

External sources
 Career story at Reprezentacija.rs.
 
 Stats in OFK Beograd from OFK Beograd unofficial website.
 

1966 births
Living people
Footballers from Podgorica
Association football goalkeepers
Yugoslav footballers
Serbia and Montenegro footballers
Serbia and Montenegro international footballers
OFK Titograd players
FK Budućnost Podgorica players
FK Sutjeska Nikšić players
OFK Beograd players
Shandong Taishan F.C. players
Jeonnam Dragons players
Elche CF players
Yugoslav Second League players
Yugoslav First League players
First League of Serbia and Montenegro players
Chinese Super League players
K League 1 players
Segunda División players
Serbia and Montenegro expatriate footballers
Expatriate footballers in China
Serbia and Montenegro expatriate sportspeople in China
Expatriate footballers in South Korea
Serbia and Montenegro expatriate sportspeople in South Korea
Expatriate footballers in Spain
Serbia and Montenegro expatriate sportspeople in Spain
Montenegrin football managers
FK Kom managers
OFK Grbalj managers
FK Budućnost Podgorica managers
FK Sutjeska Nikšić managers
FK Mornar managers